Enrique Ariel Escalante Arceo (born 23 May 1969) is a Mexican politician affiliated with the Institutional Revolutionary Party. He served as Deputy of the LIX Legislature of the Mexican Congress representing Campeche, as well as a local deputy in the LVII Legislature of the Congress of Campeche.

References

1969 births
Living people
Politicians from Campeche City
Institutional Revolutionary Party politicians
Autonomous University of Campeche alumni
Members of the Congress of Campeche
21st-century Mexican politicians
Deputies of the LIX Legislature of Mexico
Members of the Chamber of Deputies (Mexico) for Campeche